Janek Kiisman (born 3 January 1972) is a retired association football defender from Estonia. He played for several clubs in his native country, including FC Flora Tallinn, JK Viljandi Tulevik and FC Santos Tartu.

International career
Kiisman earned his first official cap for the Estonia national football team on 26 October 1994, when Estonia played Finland in a friendly match in the Kadrioru Stadium in Tallinn: 0:7. He obtained a total number of eight caps.

References

weltfussball

1972 births
Living people
Estonian footballers
Estonia international footballers
Association football defenders
Viljandi JK Tulevik players
FC Flora players
Sportspeople from Tartu